Too Soon Monsoon is the third studio album released by American rock band Wheatus. It was released on October 18, 2005 in the United States and on October 24, 2005 in the United Kingdom by the band's own label, Montauk Mantis. The album is currently available directly from the band's official website for $10, and is available to download in various formats using a 'pay what you want' donation system where the customer can donate any amount to purchase the album.

Track listing
 "Something Good" – 5:18
 "In The Melody" – 3:22
 "BMX Bandits" – 3:08
 "The London Sun" – 4:32
 "I Am What I Is" – 3:59
 "The Truth I Tell Myself" – 5:33
 "Hometown" – 5:30
 "Desperate Songs" – 3:09
 "This Island" – 6:04
 "Who Would Have Thought?" – 3:56
 "No Happy Ending Tune" – 5:37

 Digital Deluxe Edition Bonus Tracks
 12. "BMX Bandits" [Live@XM Radio] - 3:13
 13. "The London Sun" [Live@XM Radio] - 4:17

References

External links

Too Soon Monsoon at YouTube (streamed copy where licensed)

2005 albums
Self-released albums
Wheatus albums